Erik Norby (January 6, 1936 – January 16, 2007) was a Danish composer.

He is buried at Frederiksberg Ældre Kirkegård in Copenhagen.

References

This article was initially translated from the Danish Wikipedia.

Danish composers
Male composers
1936 births
2007 deaths
20th-century male musicians